Kyle Freadrich (born December 28, 1978) is a Canadian former professional ice hockey player who played for the Tampa Bay Lightning of the NHL.  He also played with several minor league teams, including the Syracuse Crunch, Louisiana IceGators, and Detroit Vipers.  Prior to beginning his professional career, Freadrich played with the Regina Pats and Prince George Cougars or the WHL.

Career statistics

Regular season and playoffs

External links
 

1978 births
Living people
Canadian expatriate ice hockey players in the United States
Canadian ice hockey left wingers
Detroit Vipers players
Louisiana IceGators (ECHL) players
Prince George Cougars players
Regina Pats players
Ice hockey people from Edmonton
Syracuse Crunch players
Tampa Bay Lightning players
Vancouver Canucks draft picks